Bazmeh (also known as Bazheh and Bazma) is a village in Barf Anbar Rural District, in the Central District of Fereydunshahr County, Isfahan Province, Iran. At the 2006 census, its population was 1,430, in 336 families.

References 

Populated places in Fereydunshahr County